Akbar Imani ghareh Aghaj Sofla (born 21 March 1992), also known as Akbar Imani, is an Iranian footballer who currently plays for Iranian club Malavan as a midfielder.

Club career
He joined Sepahan in summer of 2010 and won the league in his first season. He was loaned out to Zob Ahan for the 2013–14 season and made 21 league appearances. At the end of the season, Zob Ahan completed his permanent transfer, as he signed a five-year contract with the club.

Club career statistics 

 Assist Goals

National Team

He made his debut against Togo national football team on 5 October 2017.

Honours

Club
Sepahan
Iran Pro League (2): 2010–11, 2011–12
Hazfi Cup (1): 2012–13

Zob Ahan
Hazfi Cup (1): 2014–15

Tractor
Hazfi Cup (1): 2019–20

 Iran U-17
 AFC U-16 Championship (1): 2008

References

External links 

 

1992 births
Living people
People from Ardabil Province
Iranian footballers
Sepahan S.C. footballers
Iran under-20 international footballers
Zob Ahan Esfahan F.C. players
Foolad FC players
Tractor S.C. players
Association football midfielders